USRC Surveyor was a ship of the United States Revenue Marine captured by the United Kingdom during the War of 1812. Despite the vessel's loss, the "gallant and desperate" defense of her crew against a superior force of the Royal Navy and the Corps of Royal Marines is commemorated by the United States Coast Guard. Along with the Royal Navy frigate which bested her in battle, HMS Narcissus, Surveyor is among six legendary ships memorialized in the lyrics of the Coast Guard march "Semper Paratus".

Construction
USRC Surveyor was laid down in 1807 and commissioned the same year. Home ported in Baltimore, Maryland, different sources report her as armed either with six 12-pound carronades, or six six-pound cannon. 

Surveyor carried a normal complement of 25.

Service history

Pre-War
In 1809, according to U.S. Coast Guard records, Surveyor took the schooners Martha and Susan. The following year, in 1810, she captured a French privateer.

War of 1812

Early war
On the outbreak of hostilities with Britain in 1812, United States naval forces included 30 armed ships, 16 of which were sailed by the United States Navy with the remainder operated by the United States Revenue Marine, the maritime force of the United States Department of the Treasury. The ships of the Revenue Marine suffered from poor provisioning - the Department of the Treasury took the position that the war was not its responsibility to fight, except in circumstances where the collection of taxes was threatened, and that the costs of prosecuting the conflict should be borne by the Department of War and Department of the Navy.

In 1811, Surveyor's first mate, Samuel Travis, was promoted to ship's master. Travis had served as first mate since the ship's commissioning. Under his command, on 1 July 1812, Surveyor engaged and captured a British merchantman off the coast of Jamaica.  

In May 1813, the United Kingdom imposed a naval blockade of the United States; within the year, according to historian Melvin Jackson, the entire U.S. coast "lay all but deserted" to maritime traffic and the country was essentially cut-off from the rest of the world.

"The gallant and desperate" defense of Surveyor
On 12 June 1813, Surveyor  – embarking a crew of 18 – anchored in Chesapeake Bay near Gloucester Point. Throughout the War of 1812, the Royal Navy was active in Chesapeake Bay, engaging in ship-to-shore raids and coastal blockades, with the objective of diverting U.S. forces from Canada.

Prior to nightfall, Travis ordered the ship's boarding net raised and muskets and cutlasses placed in accessible locations on the deck. A sentry boat manned by one officer and three crewmen was also launched. 

Travis' cautious preparations were vindicated when, a few hours later, Surveyor was attacked by a Royal Navy boarding party described by different sources as between 50 to 65 sailors and marines operating from the frigate HMS Narcissus. Narcissus had entered the bay under cover of darkness and her boarding party moved against Surveyor in two small boats using muffled oars to conceal their approach. 

At 150 yards from Surveyor, the American ship's picket spotted the approaching British boats and fired an alarm shot, alerting the vessel's crew and ruining the element of surprise. As the boarders approached the vessel, they navigated away from the cutter's deck guns to neutralize their utility to the defenders. Travis ordered the crew of Surveyor to arm themselves with two muskets each and to man the rails. When the British boats were 50 yards out, he ordered his men to open fire. Despite this, Royal Navy and Royal Marines boarders ultimately gained access to the ship's deck and a fierce effort by Surveyor's crew to repel them followed. During the engagement, Royal Marine Captain Thomas Ford was mortally wounded by Travis in a cutlass duel. Nonetheless, his men outnumbered, Travis ultimately ordered the ship's surrender. In tribute to the ferocity of Surveyor'''s resistance, Travis' sword was returned to him by the boarding party's commander, Lt John Crerie, with a commendation:  

According to the United States Coast Guard, the brief engagement resulted in ten British casualties, including three fatalities. Five Americans were injured.

Travis was paroled at Washington, North Carolina, on August 7, 1813, with the remainder of the crew transferred to a British prison camp in Halifax, Nova Scotia.

Later war
Following her capture, Surveyor was re-flagged for Royal Navy use and, in June of 1813, participated in the British attack on Hampton, Virginia. She was no longer in service by 1814 and her ultimate fate is unknown.J. J. Colledge and Ben Warlow (2010).  Ships of the Royal Navy: The Complete Record of all Fighting Ships of the Royal Navy from the 15th Century to the Present, p. 390.  Casemate.

Legacy
In 1927, the United States Coast Guard christened one of its Active-class patrol boats as USCGC Travis, in honor of Samuel Travis. 

In 2012, in conjunction with bicentennial anniversary events commemorating the War of 1812, the United States Coast Guard commissioned the oil on canvas painting The Gallant Defense of Cutter Surveyor from Patrick O'Brien. It depicts Surveyor with her boarding net raised and her crew armed at the rails as four Royal Navy small boats converge on the ship. On June 15, 2014, the defense and capture of the Surveyor was reenacted at the Watermen's Museum in Yorktown, Virginia. 

Both Surveyor and Narcissus are among the six legendary ships from the Coast Guard's history mentioned in the second verse of its march "Semper Paratus", the others being USRC Eagle, USRC Hudson, USCGC Tampa, and HMS Dispatch.

See also
 Capture of USS Chesapeake, which took place on the same day
 Defense of the Cutter Eagle – another battle between HMS Narcissus and a U.S. Revenue Marine ship
 NOAAS Surveyor – another uniformed services of the United States ship named Surveyor USC&GS Surveyor – another uniformed services of the United States ship named Surveyor''

Notes

References

External links
 USRC Surveyor (painting by Noah Payne)

Ships of the United States Revenue Cutter Service
War of 1812 ships of the United States